Pro-American may refer to the following ideologies that express support for the United States, its culture, or its government:

 American imperialism, a term used to describe the far-reaching cultural and political influence of the United States beyond its borders
 American exceptionalism, ideology holding the United States as unique among nations with respect to its ideas of democracy and personal freedom
 American nationalism, indicates the aspects that characterize and distinguish the United States as an autonomous political community
 American patriotism, involving cultural attachment to the United States of America
 Americanism (ideology), patriotic values aimed at creating a collective American identity
 Americanization, influence the United States of America has on the culture of other countries

See also
 Americanism (disambiguation)
 Americanization (disambiguation)
 Anti-Americanism or Americanophobia
 Pan-American (disambiguation)
 Pan-Americanism